Lonato del Garda (before 1 July 2007 simply Lonato;) is a town and comune in the province of Brescia, in Lombardy, northern  Italy. Lonato is located about halfway between Milan and Venice, on the southwest shore of Lake Garda, the biggest lake in Italy.

Neighbouring communes are Castiglione delle Stiviere, Desenzano del Garda, Calcinato, Bedizzole, Calvagese della Riviera, Padenghe sul Garda, Pozzolengo, Montichiari, Solferino.

History

The town lies on the landscape of Morenic Hill, on the southwest side of Lake Garda. Here the first human settlements appeared in the Bronze Age on pile dwellings, as testified by archaeological findings in the areas of Polada and Lavagnone. The name Lonato is believed from some scholars to derive from the Celtic term “Lona” meaning little lake.

In the imperial Roman time, Lonato was crossed by the Basilica Emilia way, which used to connect Gaul with Aquileia. Roman ruins were found in the area of Monte Mario and Pozzo (Waiting for Godot).

The town was destroyed in the year 909 by the Hungarians, after which a new castle was built and the town fortified. In the following centuries Lonato was destroyed and rebuilt various times. In 1512 King Louis XII of France established his headquarters here when he invaded Italy. In 1516 Lonato become part of the Venetian Republic, until Napoleon arrived in 1796, when he fought and beat the Austrians during the first Italian campaign. In 1859 the town was part of the Italian Kingdom. During World War I the “basso Garda” defensive line was built, while in World War II it was a training centre for the X MAS.

The coat of arms is a lion rampant turned on the left side, with two golden keys grasped by the front legs. In 1509, King Louis XII of France granted to Lonato the honour to enrich the coat of arm with the three lilies of France, in gratitude for the favors that Lonato’s community offered him.

Lonato received the honorary title of city with a presidential decree on November 21, 1996.

Main sights

Around the main square, called Piazza Martiri della libertà, there is the town hall, the Venetian column, the Cathedral of San Giovanni Battista, and the Civic Tower (or Clock Tower).

Outside the centre of town there are Roman ruins of Fornaci, the Abbazia di Maguzzano, Drugolo Castle, the churches of Madonna di San Martino, San Cipriano, and pieve di San Zeno.

The House of the Podestà was built in the second half of the 15th century as seat of the representative of Venetian Republic, who controlled the region for more than 350 years (1441-1796). Only briefly, was Lonato under Mantuan rule under Francesco II Gonzaga (1509–1516).

After Napoleon Bonaparte granted the Venetian domains to the Austrians, the Podestà House was used by the Austrians as barracks; later it became a property of the comune of Lonato, under which it fell into disrepair.

The building was auctioned in public in 1906, and bought by Ugo da Como and his wife Maria Glisenti, who, conscious of the historical importance, called the architect A. Tagliaferri to restore it. As was fashionable in his time, they furnished the house, and today the extensive collections, including the library, 405 incunabula (one of the most important collection in Italy), 470 manuscripts and rare illuminated codes, parchments and prints. It also contains one of the smallest books in the world, 15x9 mm, which reproduces the letter by Galileo Galilei to Cristina di Lorena. In addition, it holds manuscripts letters by Ugo Foscolo to his lover Marzia Martinengo, written in 1807-1809.

The Rocca of Lonato surmounts a hill dominating the southern side of Lake Garda. The southern slope shelters the historical centre of Lonato, the limits of which, today, borders the Padana lowlands.

The fortification's irregular form reveals a central structure almost 180 meters in length and approximately 45 metres in width. It is composed of two structures at different levels: the Rocca in the upper part and, lower down, what is called the General Quarters. Despite the long domination by the Visconti and Scaligeri families, the walled embankment, built in large morenic rocks, carries Guelph merlons.

In all probability, Lonato's castle was first built around the year 1000 when fortifications were raised around the area against the invasion of the barbarians. Its architectural design closely follows the standards of the 15th and 16th centuries when it was rebuilt by the Visconti family of Milan.

After passing from the Gonzaga domination to Venice, then back to the Gonzaga and again to Venice, the castle passed to the Austrian Empire and finally to private hands. The military base was demolished and the internal and external surface was transformed into agricultural land. In 1912 the castle was declared a national monument; it was bought by Senator Ugo da Como in 1920 who partly restored it, and since 1996 it houses the Museo Civico Ornitologico, conferences, weddings and theatral shows.

The Museo Civico Ornitologico (Museum of Birds) is located inside the castle and  contains more than 700 specimens. The species represented are from the area of Lake Garda but also of exotic origin, together with specimens with rarities, unique characteristics and plumage anomalies.

The Duomo (Cathedral) of San Giovanni Battista (St. John the Baptist) dates from the 19th century. It is an example of Baroque architecture, designed by the Lonato architect Paolo Sorattini and built during the second half of the 18th century. Its balanced cupola (20 meters of diameter and 60 meters high) and facade soberly decorated with marble are the basilica's most notable points. The Baroque interior is enriched with frescoes and altar pieces by Venetian artists such as Antonio Balestra and Giambettino Cignaroli.

The Fornaci Romane (Roman Furnaces) is an archeological site south of Lonato, in Gorghi. Six Roman brickworks were recently found and restored. The brickworks have circular shape with a firing chamber built using a technique with casts of pebbles stuck together with mortar. The ruins seems to indicate that this location was an important industrial center between the 1st and 2nd century AD.

Fairs and markets

 "Mercantico": antiquity market, every 3rd week of the month, in the center of the town
 Local market: every Thursday morning, in the center of the town
 Town Fair: "Fiera di Lonato", January 17 (every year)

Transportation
Lonato can be reached by car through the A4 motorway, using the Desenzano exit; and from the A22 motorway, with the exit of Desenzano del Garda.

By airplane: the closest airports are in order
 Brescia Airport (VBS)
 Orio al Serio International Airport (BGY)
 Villafranca-Verona Airport (VRN)
 Milan Malpensa International Airport (MPX)
 Milan Linate Airport (LIN)

People 
 Reginald Pole (1500–1558) 
 Camillo Tarello (ca. 1513–1573) agronomist
 Roberto Vecchioni (born 1943)

Municipal government

The  is chaired by the mayor, who appoints others members, called .

Since 1993 the mayor of Lonato is directly elected by citizens, originally every four, then every five years. The current mayor is Roberto Tardani (FI), elected on 15 June 2015.

* Special prefectural commissioner, nominated after the resignation of the mayor.

Gallery

See also 
Rocca di Manerba del Garda

External links
 Website of the Fondation Ugo da Como
 Lonato Turism Website (italian)
  La Polada (italian)
 Brescia Transports

Sources

Cities and towns in Lombardy
Populated places on Lake Garda